Zoar is a hamlet on the Lizard Peninsula in south Cornwall, England, UK. The name of the hamlet comes from the Zoara in the Bible.

References

Hamlets in Cornwall
St Keverne